The Cambridge Buddhist Association was informally founded in 1957 when D.T. Suzuki moved to Cambridge, Massachusetts and befriended John and Elsie Mitchell, who ran a vast library of books on Buddhism and held zazen for various practitioners. The institution was incorporated in 1959 and remains active. In 1979 Maurine Stuart, a Rinzai rōshi, became President of the organization, and several influential Buddhist teachers in the United States have been members.

The Cambridge Buddhist Association ceased to offer a place of practice in September 2011, when the property that housed the Zendo was sold.

Spiritual directors
Dokuro R. Jaeckel (2004 - 2011)
Maurine Stuart (deceased)

See also
Buddhism in the United States
Timeline of Zen Buddhism in the United States

Notes

References

Buddhism in Massachusetts
Buddhist organizations based in the United States
Cambridge, Massachusetts
Zen centers in the United States